A Seattle-style hot dog, sometimes referred to as a Seattle Dog, is a hot dog topped with cream cheese  and sautéed onions and served in a pretzel bun that is often sold from late night or game day food carts in Seattle.

History
Although the origins are not clear, it has been adopted as a regional variation. It is believed that the concept began in the Pioneer Square neighborhood in the late 1980s or early 1990s. One possible inventor is Hadley Long who operated a bagel cart at night. He incorporated hot dogs on bialy sticks from the Bagel Deli on Capitol Hill with cream cheese.

Seattle Dogs increased in popularity at bars and music venues during the grunge movement of the 1990s. They are now often sold at bars and their surrounding street vendors at night. They are also available at and near the city's sporting venues. A vendor told The Seattle Weekly that he believed large crowds visiting stands outside of T-Mobile Park during the Seattle Mariners 2001 116–46 season was "the big boom" for the recipe.

Preparation
The meat is typically grilled and the pretzel roll or bun is usually toasted. Polish sausage is common. Street vendors often cut the sausage down the middle to cook it quickly and all the way through.

The use of cream cheese defines the Seattle-style hot dog. Sellers sometimes use pistol-grip sauce dispensers to quickly add the thick cream cheese. The owner of Dante's Inferno Dogs says that he was the first to introduce their use.

Grilled onions are one of the most popular additions. Other toppings include jalapeños and other peppers, sauerkraut or grilled cabbage, and scallions. Condiments such as mustard (American yellow or spicy brown), barbecue sauce, and Sriracha sauce are favorites, while ketchup is used less often.

See also

 List of hot dogs

References

Hot dogs
Culture of Seattle
Pacific Northwest cuisine